Galahad and the Holy Grail is an action-adventure game for the Atari 8-bit family designed and programmed by Douglas Crockford and published by the Atari Program Exchange in 1982. Influenced by Adventure for the Atari VCS and Arthurian legend, it contains almost 100 rooms–according to the manual–which are switched between with a flip screen technique.

Gameplay
The player explores the world, which is divided into single-screen areas representing indoor and indoor locations, finding objects and overcoming obstacles. There are no enforced goals in the game, and the manual suggests choosing one or more goals and swearing to complete them, such as "to find the three keys" or "to find the Holy Grail."

The game contains references to Atari's Adventure as well as other popular games of the day. With a nod to the film Monty Python and the Holy Grail, one of the objects found in the game is a holy hand grenade.

Development and release
Douglas Crockford wrote the game over a period of four months on an Atari 800 using the Atari Assembler Editor cartridge. The game was titled Knightsoil when submitted, but after Atari learned that night soil was a euphemism for excrement, it proposed changing the title. Because Launcelot never found the Holy Grail, Crockford proposed Galahad and the Holy Grail. According to Atari Program Exchange director Fred Thorlin, the game "contained some rather risque scenes when it was initially submitted." The game caused Chris Crawford to hire Crockford at Atari, Inc.

After the Atari Program Exchange shut down, Antic Software re-released Galahad and the Holy Grail in 1985 with the formerly printed manual on the second side of the disk. The game was sold under the same name, but the title screen was changed to read "Sir Galahad and the Holy Grail." According to an AtariAge forum member who disassembled the room structure of the game, the Antic Software version fixed a number of traversal glitches and other bugs.

Reception
Galahad and the Holy Grail was included in Antic magazine's December 1983 holiday buyer's guide. The Addison-Wesley Book of Atari Software 1984 rated the game a C. The reviewer wrote, "I hate to criticize a creative game, but Galahad has features that seem illogical to the player, features not explained in the very sparse documentation."

Galahad and the Holy Grail was one of four finalists for the 1982 Atari Star Award. The winner was Typo Attack.

References

External links
 Galahad and the Holy Grail at Atari Mania

1982 video games
Action-adventure games
Atari 8-bit family games
Atari 8-bit family-only games
Atari Program Exchange software
Video games based on Arthurian legend
Video games developed in the United States